In chemistry, amines are compounds and functional groups that contain a basic nitrogen atom with a lone pair. Amines are formally derivatives of ammonia, wherein one or more hydrogen atoms have been replaced by a substituent such as an alkyl or aryl group (these may respectively be called alkylamines and arylamines; amines in which both types of substituent are attached to one nitrogen atom may be called alkylarylamines). Important amines include amino acids, biogenic amines, trimethylamine, and aniline. Inorganic derivatives of ammonia are also called amines, such as monochloramine.

The substituent  is called an amino group.

Compounds with a nitrogen atom attached to a carbonyl group, thus having the structure , are called amides and have different chemical properties from amines.

Classification of amines
Amines can be classified according to the nature and number of substituents on nitrogen.  Aliphatic amines contain only H and alkyl substituents. Aromatic amines have the nitrogen atom connected to an aromatic ring.

Amines, alkyl and aryl alike, are organized into three subcategories (see table) based on the number of carbon atoms adjacent to the nitrogen(how many hydrogen atoms of the ammonia molecule are replaced by hydrocarbon groups):

Primary (1°) amines—Primary amines arise when one of three hydrogen atoms in ammonia is replaced by an alkyl or aromatic group. Important primary alkyl amines include, methylamine, most amino acids, and the buffering agent tris, while primary aromatic amines include aniline.
Secondary (2°) amines—Secondary amines have two organic substituents (alkyl, aryl or both) bound to the nitrogen together with one hydrogen. Important representatives include dimethylamine, while an example of an aromatic amine would be diphenylamine.
Tertiary (3°) amines—In tertiary amines, nitrogen has three organic substituents. Examples include trimethylamine, which has a distinctively fishy smell, and EDTA.

A fourth subcategory is determined by the connectivity of the substituents attached to the nitrogen:
Cyclic amines—Cyclic amines are either secondary or tertiary amines. Examples of cyclic amines include the 3-membered ring aziridine and the six-membered ring piperidine. N-methylpiperidine and N-phenylpiperidine are examples of cyclic tertiary amines.

It is also possible to have four organic substituents on the nitrogen. These species are not amines but are quaternary ammonium cations and have a charged nitrogen center.  Quaternary ammonium salts exist with many kinds of anions.

Naming conventions
Amines are named in several ways. Typically, the compound is given the prefix "amino-" or the suffix "-amine". The prefix "N-" shows substitution on the nitrogen atom. An organic compound with multiple amino groups is called a diamine, triamine, tetraamine and so forth.

Systematic names for some common amines:

Physical properties
Hydrogen bonding significantly influences the properties of primary and secondary amines. For example, methyl and ethyl amines are gases under standard conditions, whereas the corresponding methyl and ethyl alcohols are liquids. Amines possess a characteristic ammonia smell, liquid amines have a distinctive "fishy" and foul smell.

The nitrogen atom features a lone electron pair that can bind H+ to form an ammonium ion R3NH+. The lone electron pair is represented in this article by a two dots above or next to the N. The water solubility of simple amines is enhanced by hydrogen bonding involving these lone electron pairs.  Typically salts of ammonium compounds exhibit the following order of solubility in water: primary ammonium > secondary ammonium > tertiary ammonium (R3NH+). Small aliphatic amines display significant solubility in many solvents, whereas those with large substituents are lipophilic. Aromatic amines, such as aniline, have their lone pair electrons conjugated into the benzene ring, thus their tendency to engage in hydrogen bonding is diminished. Their boiling points are high and their solubility in water is low.

Spectroscopic identification
Typically the presence of an amine functional group is deduced by a combination of techniques, including mass spectrometry as well as NMR and IR spectroscopies. 1H NMR signals for amines disappear upon treatment of the sample with D2O.  In their infrared spectrum primary amines exhibit two N-H bands, whereas secondary amines exhibit only one.

Structure

Alkyl amines

Alkyl amines characteristically feature tetrahedral nitrogen centers.  C-N-C and C-N-H angles approach the idealized angle of 109°.  C-N distances are slightly shorter than C-C distances.  The energy barrier for the nitrogen inversion of the stereocenter is about 7 kcal/mol for a trialkylamine. The interconversion has been compared to the inversion of an open umbrella into a strong wind.

Amines of the type NHRR' and NRR′R″ are chiral: the nitrogen center bears four substituents counting the lone pair. Because of the low barrier to inversion, amines of the type NHRR' cannot be obtained in optical purity.  For chiral tertiary amines, NRR′R″ can only be resolved when the R, R', and R″ groups are constrained in cyclic structures such as N-substituted aziridines (quaternary ammonium salts are resolvable).

Aromatic amines
In aromatic amines ("anilines"), nitrogen is often nearly planar owing to conjugation of the lone pair with the aryl substituent.  The C-N distance is correspondingly shorter.  In aniline, the C-N distance is the same as the C-C distances.

Basicity
Like ammonia, amines are bases. Compared to alkali metal hydroxides, amines are weaker (see table for examples of conjugate acid Ka values).

The basicity of amines depends on:
 The electronic properties of the substituents (alkyl groups enhance the basicity, aryl groups diminish it).
 The degree of solvation of the protonated amine, which includes steric hindrance by the groups on nitrogen.

Electronic effects
Owing to inductive effects, the basicity of an amine might be expected to increase with the number of alkyl groups on the amine.  Correlations are complicated owing to the effects of solvation which are opposite the trends for inductive effects. Solvation effects also dominate the basicity of aromatic amines (anilines). For anilines, the lone pair of electrons on nitrogen delocalizes into the ring, resulting in decreased basicity.  Substituents on the aromatic ring, and their positions relative to the amino group, also affect basicity as seen in the table.

Solvation effects
Solvation significantly affects the basicity of amines.  N-H groups strongly interact with water, especially in ammonium ions. Consequently, the basicity of ammonia is enhanced by 1011 by solvation. The intrinsic basicity of amines, i.e. the situation where solvation is unimportant, has been evaluated in the gas phase.  In the gas phase, amines exhibit the basicities predicted from the electron-releasing effects of the organic substituents.  Thus tertiary amines are more basic than secondary amines, which are more basic than primary amines, and finally ammonia is least basic.  The order of pKb's (basicities in water) does not follow this order.  Similarly aniline is more basic than ammonia in the gas phase, but ten thousand times less so in aqueous solution.

In aprotic polar solvents such as DMSO, DMF, and acetonitrile the energy of solvation is not as high as in protic polar solvents like water and methanol.  For this reason, the basicity of amines in these aprotic solvents is almost solely governed by the electronic effects.

Synthesis

From alcohols
Industrially significant alkyl amines are prepared from ammonia by alkylation with alcohols:
ROH + NH3 -> RNH2 + H2O

From alkyl and aryl halides
Unlike the reaction of amines with alcohols the reaction of amines and ammonia with alkyl halides is used for synthesis in the laboratory:
RX + 2 R'NH2 -> RR'NH + [RR'NH2]X
In such reactions, which are more useful for alkyl iodides and bromides, the degree of alkylation is difficult to control such that one obtains mixtures of primary, secondary, and tertiary amines, as well as quaternary ammonium salts.

Selectivity can be improved via the Delépine reaction, although this is rarely employed on an industrial scale.  Selectivity is also assured in the Gabriel synthesis, which involves organohalide reacting with potassium phthalimide.

Aryl halides are much less reactive toward amines and for that reason are more controllable.  A popular way to prepare aryl amines is the Buchwald-Hartwig reaction.

From alkenes
Disubstituted alkenes react with HCN in the presence of strong acids to give formamides, which can be decarbonylated.  This method, the Ritter reaction, is used industrially to produce tertiary amines such a tert-octylamine.

Hydroamination of alkenes is also widely practiced.  The reaction is catalyzed by zeolite-based solid acids.

Reductive routes
Via the process of hydrogenation, unsaturated N-containing functional groups are reduced to amines using hydrogen in the presence of a nickel catalyst. Suitable groups include nitriles, azides, imines including oximes, amides, and nitro. In the case of nitriles, reactions are sensitive to acidic or alkaline conditions, which can cause hydrolysis of the  group.  is more commonly employed for the reduction of these same groups on the laboratory scale.

Many amines are produced from aldehydes and ketones via reductive amination, which can either proceed catalytically or stoichiometrically.

Aniline and its derivatives are prepared by reduction of the nitroaromatics. In industry, hydrogen is the preferred reductant, whereas, in the laboratory, tin and iron are often employed.

Specialized methods
Many methods exist for the preparation of amines, many of these methods being rather specialized.

Reactions

Alkylation, acylation, and sulfonation, etc.
Aside from their basicity, the dominant reactivity of amines is their nucleophilicity. Most primary amines are good ligands for metal ions to give coordination complexes. Amines are alkylated by alkyl halides. Acyl chlorides and acid anhydrides react with primary and secondary amines to form amides (the "Schotten–Baumann reaction").

Similarly, with sulfonyl chlorides, one obtains sulfonamides. This transformation, known as the Hinsberg reaction, is a chemical test for the presence of amines.

Because amines are basic, they neutralize acids to form the corresponding ammonium salts . When formed from carboxylic acids and primary and secondary amines, these salts thermally dehydrate to form the corresponding amides.

Amines undergo sulfamation upon treatment with sulfur trioxide or sources thereof: 
R2NH  +  SO3  -> R2NSO3H

Acid-base reactions
Alkyl amines protonate near pH=7 to give alkylammonium derivative.

Diazotization
Amines reacts with nitrous acid to give diazonium salts. The alkyl diazonium salts are of little importance because they are too unstable. The most important members are derivatives of aromatic amines such as aniline ("phenylamine") (A = aryl or naphthyl):
ANH2 + HNO2 + HX -> AN2+ + X- + 2 H2O

Anilines and naphthylamines form more stable diazonium salts, which can be isolated in the crystalline form. Diazonium salts undergo a variety of useful transformations involving replacement of the  group with anions. For example, cuprous cyanide gives the corresponding nitriles:

AN2+ + Y- -> AY + N2

Aryldiazonium couple with electron-rich aromatic compounds such as a phenol to form azo compounds. Such reactions are widely applied to the production of dyes.

Conversion to imines
Imine formation is an important reaction. Primary amines react with ketones and aldehydes to form imines. In the case of formaldehyde (R'  H), these products typically exist as cyclic trimers.
 RNH2 + R'_2C=O -> R'_2C=NR + H2O
Reduction of these imines gives secondary amines:
R'_2C=NR + H2 -> R'_2CH-NHR

Similarly, secondary amines react with ketones and aldehydes to form enamines:
 R2NH + R'(R''CH2)C=O -> R''CH=C(NR2)R' + H2O

Overview
An overview of the reactions of amines is given below:

Biological activity
Amines are ubiquitous in biology. The breakdown of amino acids releases amines, famously in the case of decaying fish which smell of trimethylamine. Many neurotransmitters are amines, including epinephrine, norepinephrine, dopamine, serotonin, and histamine. Protonated amino groups are the most common positively charged moieties in proteins, specifically in the amino acid lysine. The anionic polymer DNA is typically bound to various amine-rich proteins. Additionally, the terminal charged primary ammonium on lysine forms salt bridges with carboxylate groups of other amino acids in polypeptides, which is one of the primary influences on the three-dimensional structures of proteins.

Application of amines

Dyes
Primary aromatic amines are used as a starting material for the manufacture of azo dyes. It reacts with nitrous acid to form diazonium salt, which can undergo coupling reaction to form an azo compound. As azo-compounds are highly coloured, they are widely used in dyeing industries, such as:

 Methyl orange
 Direct brown 138
 Sunset yellow FCF
 Ponceau

Drugs
Approximately 42% of drugs and drug candidates contain amine functional groups:
 Chlorpheniramine is an antihistamine that helps to relieve allergic disorders due to cold, hay fever, itchy skin, insect bites and stings.
 Chlorpromazine is a tranquilizer that sedates without inducing sleep. It is used to relieve anxiety, excitement, restlessness or even mental disorder.
 Ephedrine and phenylephrine, as amine hydrochlorides, are used as decongestants.
 Amphetamine, methamphetamine, and methcathinone are psychostimulant amines that are listed as controlled substances by the US DEA.
 Thioridazine, an antipsychotic drug, is an amide which is believed to exhibit its antipsychotic effects, in part, due to its effects on other amides.
 Amitriptyline, imipramine, lofepramine and clomipramine are tricyclic antidepressants and tertiary amines.
 Nortriptyline, desipramine, and amoxapine are tricyclic antidepressants and secondary amines. (The tricyclics are grouped by the nature of the final amino group on the side chain.)
 Substituted tryptamines and phenethylamines are key basic structures for a large variety of psychedelic drugs.
 Opiate analgesics such as morphine, codeine, and heroin are tertiary amines.

Gas treatment
Aqueous monoethanolamine (MEA), diglycolamine (DGA), diethanolamine (DEA), diisopropanolamine (DIPA) and methyldiethanolamine (MDEA) are widely used industrially for removing carbon dioxide (CO2) and hydrogen sulfide (H2S) from natural gas and refinery process streams. They may also be used to remove CO2 from combustion gases and flue gases and may have potential for abatement of greenhouse gases. Related processes are known as sweetening.

Epoxy resin curing agents
Amines are often used as epoxy resin curing agents. These include dimethylethylamine, cyclohexylamine, and a variety of diamines such as 4,4 -diaminodicyclohexylmethane. Multifunctional amines such as tetraethylenepentamine and triethylenetetramine are also widely used in this capacity. The reaction proceeds by the lone pair of electrons on the amine nitrogen attacking the outermost carbon on the oxirane ring of the epoxy resin. This relieves ring strain on the epoxide and is the driving force of the reaction.

Safety
They are skin irritants, especially as some are easily absorbed through the skin. Amines are a broad class of compounds, and more complex members of the class can be extremely bioactive, for example strychnine.

See also
 Acid-base extraction
 Amine value
 Amine gas treating
 Ammine
 Biogenic amine
 Ligand isomerism
 Official naming rules for amines as determined by the International Union of Pure and Applied Chemistry (IUPAC)

References

Further reading

External links

 Synthesis of amines
 Factsheet, amines in food

 
Functional groups